BCAM may stand for:

 Basal cell adhesion molecule
 Basque Center for Applied Mathematics
 Breast Cancer Awareness Month
 Broad Contemporary Art Museum